Altericroceibacterium xinjiangense is a Gram-negative, strictly aerobic, rod-shaped and non-motile bacterium from the genus Altericroceibacterium which has been isolated from desert sand from Xinjiang in China.

References

External links
Type strain of Altererythrobacter xinjiangensis at BacDive -  the Bacterial Diversity Metadatabase

Sphingomonadales
Bacteria described in 2012